The 2015 Australian Formula 3 Championship was an Australian motor racing competition for cars constructed in accordance with FIA Formula 3 regulations. It was sanctioned by the Confederation of Australian Motor Sport (CAMS) as a national championship, with Formula 3 Management Pty Ltd appointed as the Category Manager. The Championship began on 27 March at Sandown Raceway and ended on 18 October at Wakefield Park after seven rounds across three states. The title, which was the 15th Australian Formula 3 Championship, was won by Gilmour Racing's Jon Collins by 1 point over Ricky Capo after both were excluded from the final race of the year.

CAMS removed the Gold Star award from the Australian Formula 3 Championship for 2015. The move ended a 58-year tradition, the award being the third oldest continually awarded CAMS title after the Australian Grand Prix and Australian Hillclimb Championship.

Teams and drivers
The following teams and drivers contested the 2015 Australian Formula 3 Championship. All teams and drivers were Australian-registered.

Classes
Competing cars were nominated into one of four classes:
 Australian Formula 3 Championship – for automobiles constructed in accordance with the FIA Formula 3 regulations that applied in the year of manufacture between 1 January 2005 and 31 December 2011.
 National Class – for automobiles constructed in accordance with the FIA Formula 3 regulations that applied in the year of manufacture between 1 January 1999 and 31 December 2007.
 Kumho Cup Class – for automobiles constructed in accordance with the FIA Formula 3 regulations that applied in the year of manufacture between 1 January 1999 and 31 December 2004.
 Invitational Class.

Points system
Championship points were awarded in each class as follows:
 One point to the driver placed in the highest grid position in each class for the first race at each round.
 12–9–8–7–6–5–4–3–2–1 for the first ten finishing positions in each class in each of the first two races at each round.
 20–15–12–10–8–6–4–3–2–1 basis for the first ten finishing positions in each class in the third race at each round and in the fourth race at the Wakfield Park round.
 One point to the driver that achieved the fastest lap time in each class in each race of the championship.

Race calendar

The Championship was contested over a seven-round series.  All races were held in Australia.

Note:
 Mount Panorama was removed from the calendar after being included for the last three years.
 Hidden Valley was removed from the calendar after being included for the last four years
 The results for each round of the Championship were determined by the results of the final race of the round.
 The Kumho Cup was contested only at Rounds 1,4,5 and 7.

Championship Standings

See also
 Australian Drivers' Championship
 Australian Formula 3

References

External links
 
 Online race results at www.natsoft.com.au
 Shannons Nationals
 2015 Results, www.formula3.com.au, as archived at web.archive.org on 29 December 2015

Fomula 3
Australian Formula 3 seasons
Australia
Australian Formula 3